Dartut-e Rahim (also Romanized as Dārtūt-e Raḥīm; also known as Dārtūt) is a village in Howmeh Rural District, in the Central District of Gilan-e Gharb County, Kermanshah Province, Iran. At the 2006 census, its population was 41, in 8 families.

References 

Populated places in Gilan-e Gharb County